Rambling Rose is a 1991 American drama film set in Georgia during the Great Depression starring Laura Dern and Robert Duvall in leading roles with Lukas Haas, John Heard and Diane Ladd in supporting roles. Rambling Rose was directed by Martha Coolidge and written by Calder Willingham (adapted from his own 1972 novel of the same name).

Laura Dern and Diane Ladd, daughter and mother in real life, were nominated for the Academy Award for Best Actress and Best Supporting Actress, respectively, making them the first mother-daughter duo to be nominated for Academy Awards for the same film or in the same year. The film won the Independent Spirit Award for Best Film and Martha Coolidge won the Independent Spirit Award for Best Director.

Plot
In 1971, a grown Buddy returns to his former family home and reflects on his youth during The Great Depression when Rose came to live with his family in order to escape her miserable life in Birmingham, where she was being forced into prostitution. The Hillyers are an eccentric family who take Rose in as a domestic servant. Rose quickly begins to admire Mrs. Hillyer, who is working on her master's thesis and who she learns was orphaned at a young age, just as Rose had been. Rose also develops a crush on the paternal and warm Mr. Hillyer that the three Hillyer children and Mr. Hillyer become aware of while Mrs. Hillyer remains oblivious.  Because she is hard of hearing (she carries an early kind of hearing aid) she misses some of the byplay.

Eventually Rose kisses Mr. Hillyer, who at first responds to her advances and then becomes angered at her and rebuffs her. Buddy witnesses Rose and Mr. Hillyer kissing and later, when Rose gets into his bed to talk to him at night, he repeatedly tries and eventually is allowed to grab and massage her breast just as his father had done while he was kissing Rose. Eventually to satisfy his curiosity Rose allows 13-year-old Buddy to masturbate her. Afterwards she is apologetic and upset and begs him not to tell anyone.

The Hillyers begin to disagree about Rose's presence in their lives. Mr. Hillyer worries that Rose is too promiscuous when she goes to town and will cause them problems but Mrs. Hillyer sees her promiscuity as her way of trying to obtain love and attention.

Strange men begin lurking around the house and even fighting with one another. Mr. Hillyer attributes this to Rose but she repeatedly denies knowing them before eventually admitting it. However, Rose is eventually arrested when some of her men begin brawling in a bar over her and she bites the finger of a policeman. Though the police and Mrs. Hillyer are willing to forgive Rose, Mr. Hillyer insists on firing her, but before he can Rose is hospitalized with a bad case of pneumonia. The attending doctor tells them that Rose has too strong a basic constitution to have had the desperately poor country background she has asserted. She develops a passion for the doctor, who spends a rather long time in her bedroom in his visits to her during her convalescence. After she recovers, Rose seems to be on her best behaviour but Mr. Hillyer eventually catches her with another man in her room. He fires her but obtains a position on a dairy farm in Tennessee for her. When he informs Rose she begins crying as she does not want her baby being born on a farm.

Mr. Hillyer believes she is lying about being pregnant and the Hillyers take her to a doctor where they learn that while she is showing signs of being pregnant she actually has an ovarian cyst and is sterile because of untreated gonorrhea contracted when she was 15. The doctor recommends a radical full hysterectomy, involving the removal of the womb and both ovaries, potentially resulting in a less feminine appearance and reduced sexual drive, as it would reduce Rose's promiscuous behaviour. While Mr. Hillyer at first agrees to the operation Mrs. Hillyer argues against it and eventually persuades the two men. Rose is treated for her cyst and returns home where she eventually marries the policeman whose finger she bit. Returning to the 1971 reflection, Buddy reveals that Rose married three more times and was eventually happy with and faithful to her last husband with whom she lived for 25 years. He goes to talk to his father who tells him that Rose died the previous week. When Buddy begins crying Mr. Hillyer tells him that Rose is a person who will never really die as she will live on forever in their hearts.

Cast
 Laura Dern as Rose, an orphan who comes to work for the Hillyer family
 Diane Ladd as Mrs. Hillyer
 Robert Duvall as Mr. Hillyer
 Lukas Haas as Willcox "Buddy" Hillyer
 John Heard as adult Buddy Hillyer
 Lisa Jakub as Frances "Dolly" Hillyer
 Evan Lockwood as Warren "Waski" Hillyer
 Kevin Conway as Dr. Martinson 
 Robert John Burke as Dave Wilkie, Rose's first husband

Production
In reference to the bed scene between Laura Dern and Lukas Haas, director Martha Coolidge said Lukas was sort of the perfect age to play the part of Buddy. "It was important not to have a child, because the scene would have been unpleasant. It was also important not to have a man, because the scene would have meant something else." Capitalizing on the actor's curiosity about sex, Coolidge said, "Lukas knows that acting is living. He has made 25 movies. His great gift in Rambling Rose is that he shared something important, his first experience with sex, with the audience. Yet the whole scene is an illusion, except when he touches Laura's breasts."

Reception
The film received overwhelmingly positive reviews. On Rotten Tomatoes, it has a 100% approval rating, based on 20 reviews. Peter Travers of Rolling Stone praised the storytelling and performances, summarizing the film as a "beauty." Roger Ebert of the Chicago Sun-Times gave the film 3 out of 4 stars, saying "The movie is all character and situation, and contains some of the best performances of the year, especially in the ensemble acting of the four main characters." On his TV program with Gene Siskel, both critics gave it a thumbs up. Owen Gleiberman of Entertainment Weekly gave the film a B, extolling the performances, particularly Dern. He wrote that, "No young actress today can play emotionally hungry postadolescents with such purity and yearning."

Awards and nominations

Notes

References

External links
 
 
 

1991 films
1991 drama films
American drama films
Carolco Pictures films
1990s English-language films
Films scored by Elmer Bernstein
Films about sexuality
Films based on American novels
Films directed by Martha Coolidge
Films set in Georgia (U.S. state)
Films set in the 1930s
Films set in 1971
Films shot in North Carolina
Independent Spirit Award for Best Film winners
1991 independent films
Films set in the 1970s
Films about puberty
1990s coming-of-age drama films
1990s American films